Ray Alan (18 September 1930 – 24 May 2010) was an English ventriloquist and television entertainer from the 1950s until the 1980s. He was associated primarily with the dummies Lord Charles and Ali Kat and later with the puppets Tich and Quackers. Lord Charles was the first ventriloquist's dummy to have his own personal microphone.

Early life
Born in Greenwich, London, Alan was educated at Morden Terrace School, Lewisham. Alan was introduced to the world of entertainment at a young age, entering a talent contest at the age of five at his local Gaumont cinema.

Entertainment career
Aged 13, Alan became a call-boy at the Hippodrome Theatre in Lewisham, where he started to do magic sets on stage between acts. He then started to entertain private functions, introducing ventriloquism into his act, along with playing the ukulele.

Alan toured in cabaret all over the world and performed once with Laurel and Hardy in 1954. Laurel had provided inspiration for the look of Alan's most famous creation, Lord Charles, who first appeared at a charity show in Wormwood Scrubs Prison, London.

Alan made his television debut with Lord Charles on the BBC programme The Good Old Days in the 1960s and the pair regularly re-appeared on the programme. In the 1960s he also appeared on a children's programme Tich and Quackers with Tich, a small boy, and his pet duck Quackers. He also created the puppet character Ali Cat for the HTV series Magic Circle (1977). He was also the presenter for two years of the BBC show Ice Show. In 1985 he was a special guest for Bob Hope's birthday show at London's Lyric Theatre. In 1986 he presented a show on Channel 4 on ventriloquism, called A Gottle of Geer.

Alan continued to perform into his seventies, doing tours and also undertaking conference and corporate events. In 1998/1999 he entertained guests on the QE2. He also wrote for many shows, including a documentary entitled A Gottle of Geer for Channel 4, and the ITV show And There's More in 1985 which starred Jimmy Cricket. 

He took a break from stage work due to ill health but he did not rule out a return, if his health had permitted. His last stage appearance was in November 2008 when he performed at a special charity concert in Bridlington organised by his friend Greg Knight who was MP for the town. At the end of his performance he received a standing ovation.

Writing
Alan wrote four novels: Death and Deception in 2007 and A Game of Murder in 2008 (both published by Robert Hale), A Fear of Vengeance (2010, published by FA Thorpe) and Retribution (2011, published posthumously by Robert Hale). 

He also wrote for Tony Hancock, Dave Allen and for the shows Morecambe and Wise, The Two Ronnies and Bootsie and Snudge, usually under the name Ray Whyberd.

Death
Alan died aged 79 on the morning of 24 May 2010. It is thought he stopped breathing overnight after complaining of feeling unwell at his home in Reigate, Surrey. His agent Peter Prichard said: "He passed away very suddenly."

Media appearances

Television 
 David Nixon's Comedy Bandbox (1966)
 The Tich and Quackers Show (1966)
 Ice Show (1969)
 Tell Me Another (1976–1978, guest, comedic anecdotal series)
 Magic Circle (1977)
 Three Little Words (c.1980)
 The Sooty Show – Soo's Party Problem (1983)
 Mike Reid's Mates and Music (1984)
 Bobby Davro's TV Weekly (1987)

Alan was also the presenter of the panel game Where in the World and of the children's quiz show It's Your Word. He also hosted Cartoon Carnival and made many appearances on later game shows such as Celebrity Squares, Give Us A Clue, Family Fortunes, 3-2-1, Bullseye and The Bob Monkhouse Show. Alan also appeared on The Des O'Connor Show and on Blue Peter.

Radio 
 The Impressionists, BBC Radio 2 (guest 1974–75; host 1980–88)
Just A Minute, BBC Radio 4 (four appearances late 1970s)
 News Huddlines, BBC Radio 4 (presenter for one show, 29 October 1975)

References

External links 
 

People from Greenwich
English television personalities
Ventriloquists
1930 births
2010 deaths
Deaths from respiratory failure